

330001–330100 

|-bgcolor=#f2f2f2
| colspan=4 align=center | 
|}

330101–330200 

|-bgcolor=#f2f2f2
| colspan=4 align=center | 
|}

330201–330300 

|-bgcolor=#f2f2f2
| colspan=4 align=center | 
|}

330301–330400 

|-bgcolor=#f2f2f2
| colspan=4 align=center | 
|}

330401–330500 

|-id=420
| 330420 Tomroman ||  || Thomas A. Roman (born 1952), a professor at Central Connecticut State University. || 
|-id=440
| 330440 Davinadon ||  || Davina O'Brien (born 1949) and Donovan Edward O'Brien (born 1945), of Tea Gardens, Australia, are friends of the discoverer, Andrew Lowe. || 
|-id=455
| 330455 Anbrysse ||  || An Brysse (born 1969), the most successful participant in the "Run to the moon", a fund-raising event for Belgian cancer research in 2016, and for all the people who lost their fight, those who are still fighting and the ones who will have to fight cancer. || 
|}

330501–330600 

|-bgcolor=#f2f2f2
| colspan=4 align=center | 
|}

330601–330700 

|-id=634
| 330634 Boico ||  || Vladimir Boico (1909–2001), a Romanian amateur astronomer. || 
|-id=640
| 330640 Yangxuejun ||  || Yang Xuejun (born 1963), is an academician of the Chinese Academy of Sciences. He designed the world's first practical CPU-GPU heterogeneous architecture and developed the "Tianhe" high-performance computer system for China, leading the World TOP500 board on seven occasions. || 
|}

330701–330800 

|-id=712
| 330712 Rhodescolossus ||  || The Colossus of Rhodes was a tall statue of the Greek god Helios and one of the Seven Wonders of the Ancient World. It built in the city of Rhodes during the 3rd century BC. || 
|}

330801–330900 

|-id=836
| 330836 Orius ||  || The centaur Orius, who lived in the mountains, was killed by Heracles when he tried to steal the wine of Pholus. || 
|-id=856
| 330856 Ernsthelene ||  || Ernst (1920–1997) and Helene Kling (1919–2003), parents of German co-discoverer Rainer Kling || 
|}

330901–331000 

|-id=934
| 330934 Natevanwey ||  || Nate Van Wey (born 1950), high school teacher of physics at Perry High School for 42 years and recognized for all of the student's lives he has influenced || 
|}

References 

330001-331000